Supplejack Downs, also known as Suplejack Downs, is a pastoral lease operating as a cattle station in the Northern Territory of Australia.

Supplejack shares a boundary with the Purtu Aboriginal Land Trust to the west and is otherwise surrounded by vacant crown land.

Suplejack occupies an area of  along the margins of the Tanami Desert and is accessible by the Tanami Track. The country is composed of rolling hills, tablelands open plains and flood-out country, with herbage such as Mitchell grass, Flinders grass and oat grass, along with trees and shrubs including suplejack, mulga, whitewood and spinifex. The property supports a herd of approximately 8,000 cattle.

The property was established in 1961 by Bob and Lil Savage when they were granted a grazing licence for the area. Construction of a homestead commenced in 1965 as did fencing and the drilling of bores. The Savages had previously worked on the nearby stations Hooker Creek and Yuendumu, before deciding on settling at Suplejack.

Another family, the Cooks, were also living at Suplejack in 1976.

A pastoral lease was granted to the Savages by the government in 1978, which they still held in 2011.

Tragedy struck the Cook family during the cattle muster of 2008 when a helicopter crash left Rob Cook a quadriplegic as a result of spinal injuries he received in the crash. The pastoral community rallied around the Cook family and raised 75,000 to support them, while Rob received treatment in an Adelaide hospital. Rob later crossed the Tanami Desert in his modified four wheel drive wheelchair to raise money for his Nuffield Scholarship, and was awarded a courage medal at the national Pride of Australia awards in 2011. He received a Nuffield Scholarship in 2011.

See also
List of ranches and stations

References

Pastoral leases in the Northern Territory
Stations (Australian agriculture)
1961 establishments in Australia